Noam Achtel (born 16 April 1996) is an Israeli footballer who plays as a defender and has appeared for the Israel women's national team.

Career
Achtel has been capped for the Israel national team, appearing for the team during the 2019 FIFA Women's World Cup qualifying cycle.

References

External links
 
 
 

1996 births
Living people
People from Yagur
Israeli women's footballers
Women's association football defenders
Ligat Nashim players
Israel women's international footballers
Jewish footballers
Jewish Israeli sportspeople
Jewish sportswomen